Stuttflog Glacier is a glacier flowing north between Mount Grytoyr and Mount Pertrellfjellet in the Muhlig-Hofmann Mountains, Queen Maud Land, Antarctica. Mapped by Norwegian cartographers from surveys and air photos by the Norwegian Antarctic Expedition (1956–60) and named Stuttflogbreen (short rock wall glacier).

See also
 List of glaciers in the Antarctic
 Glaciology

References
 

Glaciers of Queen Maud Land
Princess Martha Coast